Jan Bucher  (born 1957) is an American freestyle skier and world champion.

She won a gold medal in acroski (ski ballet) at the FIS Freestyle World Ski Championships 1986 in Tignes. At the FIS Freestyle World Ski Championships 1989 in Oberjoch, she won a second gold medal in ski ballet. She won a silver medal in ski ballet at the FIS Freestyle World Ski Championships 1991 in Lake Placid.

She took part at the 1988 Winter Olympics in Calgary, where ski ballet was a demonstration event.

References

External links 
 

1957 births
Living people
American female freestyle skiers
21st-century American women